Herbert Hovenkamp (born 1948) is an American legal scholar serving as James G. Dinan University Professor at the University of Pennsylvania Law School and the Wharton School of the University of Pennsylvania. Prior to that he held the Ben and Dorothy Willie Chair at the University of Iowa College of Law. Hovenkamp is a recognized expert and prolific author in the area of antitrust law.

Biography
Hovenkamp graduated from Calvin College in 1969. He then did graduate study at the University of Texas at Austin, receiving an M.A. in American literature in 1971 and a Ph.D. in American civilization in 1976. He also attended the University of Texas School of Law, receiving a Juris Doctor degree in 1978.

Hovenkamp was previously Professor of Law at the University of California Hastings College of Law.  Hovenkamp is a member of the American Academy of Arts and Sciences.

Antitrust scholarship 
Hovenkamp is sometimes cited as "the most influential antitrust scholar of our generation" and the New York Times reported that many consider him "the dean of American antitrust law."  Along with the now-deceased Phillip Areeda, Hovenkamp is one of the two authors of Antitrust Law, a widely cited American antitrust law treatise.

In each of the last ten antitrust cases heard by the United States Supreme Court, either the petitioner or the solicitor general pointed to Hovenkamp as supporting the position the justices were being urged to take. Professor Hovenkamp’s writings have been cited in 36 Supreme Court decisions and more than 1300 decisions in the lower courts.

Thomas Hungar, deputy solicitor general of the United States from 2003 to 2008, has called Hovenkamp one of the prime shapers of antitrust legal interpretation by U.S. courts.

In 2008, Hovenkamp received the John Sherman Award from the Antitrust Division of the Department of Justice.  The award is presented approximately once every three years to "a person or persons for their outstanding achievement in antitrust law, contributing to the protection of American consumers and to the preservation of economic liberty."

References

External links
 Penn Law Faculty page
 SSRN page

Calvin University alumni
University of Texas at Austin alumni
American legal scholars
Living people
1948 births
American people of Dutch descent
Scholars of competition law
University of Iowa College of Law faculty
University of California, Hastings faculty
University of Pennsylvania Law School faculty